The 2017 Texas A&M Aggies football team represented Texas A&M University in the 2017 NCAA Division I FBS football season. The Aggies played their home games at Kyle Field in College Station, Texas and competed in the Western Division of the Southeastern Conference (SEC). They were led by sixth-year head coach Kevin Sumlin. They finished the season 7–6, 4–4 in SEC play to finish in a tie for fourth place in the Western Division. They were invited to the Belk Bowl where they lost to Wake Forest. This season was the first time since 2009 that Texas A&M was not ranked in the AP Poll during the regular season.

On November 26, head coach Kevin Sumlin was fired. He finished at Texas A&M with a six-year record of 51–26. Interim head coach Jeff Banks led the Aggies in the Belk Bowl.

On December 2, Florida State head coach Jimbo Fisher was hired by Texas A&M as their new head coach.

Schedule
Texas A&M announced its 2017 football schedule on September 13, 2016. The 2017 schedule consists of 7 home games, 4 away games and 1 neutral site game in the regular season. The Aggies will host SEC foes Alabama, Auburn, Mississippi State, and South Carolina, and will travel to Florida, LSU, and Ole Miss. Texas A&M will go against Arkansas for the fourth time in a row in Arlington, Texas.

The Aggies will host three of its four non–conference games which are against Louisiana from the Sun Belt Conference, New Mexico from the Mountain West Conference and Nicholls State from the Southland Conference and travel to UCLA from the Pac-12 Conference.

Schedule Source:

Roster

Coaching staff

Game summaries

UCLA

The Texas A&M Aggies opened up the 2017 season on the road against the UCLA Bruins at the Rose Bowl. Despite leading the Bruins 44–10 with 4:08 left in the 3rd, the Aggies were stifled in the 4th quarter, losing 45–44. The 34 point comeback victory is the largest in UCLA history. Nick Starkel started at quarterback for Texas A&M before leaving the game with an apparent left foot injury, with Kellen Mond taking his place.

Nicholls State

Louisiana

Arkansas

South Carolina

Alabama

Florida

Mississippi State

Auburn

New Mexico

Ole Miss

LSU

Rankings

References

Texas AandM
Texas A&M Aggies football seasons
Texas AandM Aggies football